Strange Hill High is a British children's puppet-animated series for CBBC. The show is a co-production between CBBC, FremantleMedia and Factory.

Out of the many writers, it was noted that Josh Weinstein (who worked on The Simpsons and Futurama) would be involved in the series, with its visuals created using an animation technique combining puppets, Japanese vinyl toys and digital effects.
The show continued to air reruns until 2020. 2 DVDs of the first series were released containing all 13 episodes.

Premise
Strange Hill High mainly follows a group of three students: Mitchell Tanner, a pupil with attention deficit hyperactivity disorder who comes up with plans to resolve various conflicts, while avoiding studying for tests; Becky Butters, a conscientious schoolgirl who tries her best to get out of whatever problems she gets involved in; and the sometimes dull and robotic Templeton, who comes up with bizarre quips and interpretations, as they explore their extraordinary school, uncovering absurd and outrageous occurrences as they go.

The students meet a variety of people involved in the oddities of their school, but have to be wary of some of the students and faculty members - mainly Mr. Abercrombie, who is easily angered by any disturbance.

Cast
Main Cast
Doc Brown as Mitchell Tanner, Bishop and others
Emma Kennedy as Becky Butters
Richard Ayoade as Templeton
Jonathan Keeble as Mr. Abercrombie, Mr. Brian Docherty, Murdoch and others
John Thomson as Peter Dustpan, Mr. Balding and others
Caroline Aherne as Stephanie, Croydonia and others
Marc Silk as Matthews, Tyson, the Ghosts in Detention, Mr. Garden, Ian Gatlin, Lucas, and others
Melissa Sinden as Miss Grackle, Ms. Grimshaw, Samia and others
Matt King as Mr. Creeper

Guest Stars
Chris Johnson as Ken Kong
Alison Moyet as Terpsichore (a.k.a. Joy)

Episodes

Series overview

Series 1   (2013)

Series 2 (2014)

Ratings
Episode ratings from BARB.

Awards and nominations

See also
Grange Hill – unrelated 1978–2008 British television children's drama series that also takes place at a school
Strange Hill – unrelated British comic strip with a similar name that also takes place at a school

References

External links
 

2013 British television series debuts
2014 British television series endings
2010s British animated television series
2010s British children's television series
British children's animated adventure television series
British children's animated mystery television series
British children's animated science fantasy television series
British children's animated comic science fiction television series
British high school television series
British television shows featuring puppetry
English-language television shows
BBC children's television shows
BBC high definition shows
Television series by FremantleMedia Kids & Family